The Cellar is a 2022 supernatural horror film written and directed by Brendan Muldowney and starring Elisha Cuthbert and Eoin Macken. It follows a family whose daughter disappears in the cellar of the large estate they have just moved into. The film was released via Shudder on 15 April 2022.

Plot
Brian and Kiera Woods move into an old decadent house with their two children Ellie(a teen) and Steven(an elementary child). Ellie immediately voices opposition from the beginning wishing to be back with her friends. 

The first night they are there, Kiera and Brian must go into the office for work, and leave Ellie to watch Steven, much to her dismay. Steven finds a secret room that contains older items, and has Ellie play the sonographe they found. It begins with a man reciting forumlas and then counting up slowly. Ellie shuts it off before it reaches seven and tells Steven to go to bed. 

While Steven is sleeping and Ellie is watching TV, the power goes out and Ellie frantically calls her mother. Kiera has Ellie count up to 10, the number of the stairs down to the cellar where the breaker is located. Kiera notices that when Ellie gets to 10, she continues to count in a dreamlike manner. Brian and Kiera rush home to find Ellie missing and a search is sent out for her. 

The next day, unable to find Ellie the local police deem she has run away and will turn up in a few days, seeing as how she has a history of running away. Keira knows something is wrong and investigates herself. 

In the cellar she finds mysterious equations etched into the floor, and plant-based paint on the far wall in the forms of red haunted faces. After having the police look at it, they determine its from the 1950's and question who owned the house previously. Brian responds by saying they bought it for almost nothing at auction from an elderly woman.

Later that night while Brian and Kiera are sleeping, Steven wakes Kiera up to tell her he has wet the bed. After helping and sending him back to bed, she hears whispering from the upstairs bathroom sink in the form of a girl counting up. As the counting continues she makes her way down to the cellar door. She opens the door and turns the light on before going down the steps to find nothing. 

The next day Kiera asks Brian what the different symbols above all the doors in the house mean. Kiera takes pictures of the symbols and goes into the office and has her coworker Erica find out what they mean. She tells her they are Hebrew glyphs that spell out "Leviathen", a sea creature of Jewish mythology.  

Later at the house Kiera plays the sonographe from earlier and Steven begins to count with it while walking towards the secret room. Kiera snaps him out of it. While researching the man in the portrait that hangs in the house, John Fetherston, the cellar door opens and the lights slowly go out. Steven calls for help from the cellar and Kiera goes to get him out of the closed Cellar, while looking through the keyhole she sees a monstrous eye only for Steven to ask her from behind who she's talking to as he's been asleep the whole time. The door opens slightly and the lights return. Kiera goes into the cellar, the lights off and the door swings shut. A growling is heard slowly ascending the steps after Kiera drops her phone down the stairs. She becomes frightened until Brian shows up and opens the door. 

Kiera tells Brian that something is down there, her phone disappeared and the people who used to own the house, the Fetherstons, all went missing except their daughter. Brian believes she's overreacting and goes down to look for her phone, finding animal hair instead, the phone gone. 

The next day Kiera goes to the National College of Mathematics to meet with Dr. Remi Fournet. She gives him the paper with the equation on it and he says it's "Delta point vector sum epsilon partial I equals 1N DY by DX", the same words from the sonographe. He tells her Fetherston was a colleague of Erwin Schroödinger at the college on a unity theory until his son became ill and then he completely disappeared. He tells her at first glance the equation is a representation of dimesion(s) and is incredibly complictaed. Kiera gets home with her new phone and Remi calls her asking if she's okay as he called and heard someone pick up who was counting. He then tells her a colleague of his stated the equation was created in the 12th century by alchemists, it was like an unfinished incantation. He also says there is a similar case of house in Belgium with similar markings and everyone had disappeared. 

Brian gets upset with Kieras theories and so she takes him into the cellar to show him the symbols. While there, Steven walks toward the mysterious secret room. Brian tells Kiera she's being delusional and refuses to help her. He attempts to destroy the bottom step and the sonographe turns on to count while Steven sees a cruel form of Ellie with symbols carved on her face and she counts in unison. Kiera and Brian run upstairs after he screams and Brian finds Ellies phone in the room. 

Kiera goes to visit Rose Fetherston at St Antonys private nursing home. Roses tells her it was her father who brought the dark entity into this world, to save her sick brother Jack. She tells Kiera it is Leviathen, one of the seven princes of hell who has gone by many names and is ancient evil. She also tells her its not just the cellar, but the whole house. 

When Kiera gets home, Brian shows her the research he's done, that the shapes and symbols over the doors make a pentagon, which combined with Leviathen means "Baphomet", a goat-human with wings, a demon worshipped by the occults Knight Templar. As they are talking, Steven follows his drone into the cellar as the sonographe plays. Baphomet appears and takes Steven as he reaches the bottom the lights go out. They search for Steven with the lights out, and find him in the secret room with a carving on his chest. Both he and Brian begin counting down from 48 and Kiera runs from Baphomet when they reach one, with the chase leading down the cellar stairs which are now very long leading to a lone door at the end. 

Kiera hides behind the door, and after Baphomet has gone, she continues walking down the passage way and finds what seems to be an endless crowd of people, all counting different numbers as they shuffle forward in a lifeless dimension. She finds Ellie after losing hope and brings her back, escaping Baphomet and saying he cannot take her family. She reunites with Brian and Steven. 

Together again she leads her family to the front door and opens it, revealing they never left the demons dimension and Ellie, Steve and Brian begin to count turning away and waking into the cellar, and the credits roll has Kiera joins in the counting.

Cast

Production
An international co-production between Ireland and Belgium. The film was shot on November 2020 in Roscommon, Ireland.

Release
The film premiered at South by Southwest in March 2022 before being released via Shudder on 15 April 2022.

References

External links

2022 films
2022 horror films
Irish horror films
Supernatural horror films
Demons in film
Belgian horror films
Films set in Ireland
Films shot in Ireland
Shudder (streaming service) original programming
2020s English-language films